Luling Independent School District is a public school district based in Luling, Texas (USA).  Located in Caldwell County, a small portion of the district extends into Guadalupe County. It also serves the unincorporated communities of Joliet, McNeil, and Soda Springs.

In 2009, the school district was rated "academically acceptable" by the Texas Education Agency.

Schools
Luling High School (Grades 9-12)
Luling Junior High (Grades 6-8)
Leonard Shanklin Elementary (Grades 3-5)
Luling Primary (Grades 1-2)

References

External links
Luling ISD

School districts in Caldwell County, Texas
School districts in Guadalupe County, Texas